Gonia sagax is a species of bristle fly in the family Tachinidae. It is found in North America.

References

Further reading

External links

 

Exoristinae
Articles created by Qbugbot
Insects described in 1892
Taxa named by Charles Henry Tyler Townsend